Gonystylus areolatus grows as a small tree up to  tall. Bark is greyish brown. Habitat is mixed dipterocarp forest at around  altitude. G. areolatus is endemic to Borneo.

References

areolatus
Endemic flora of Borneo
Trees of Borneo
Plants described in 1952